Gateshead is a suburb of the City of Lake Macquarie, Greater Newcastle, New South Wales, Australia,   from Newcastle's central business district on the eastern side of Lake Macquarie. It is part of the City of Lake Macquarie  East ward, and is home to a number of primary and high schools and a private hospital. Gateshead is named after Gateshead, a town in North East England.

References

External links
 History of Gateshead (Lake Macquarie City Library)

Suburbs of Lake Macquarie